Thoisy may refer to:

People

 Geoffroy de Thoisy, Burgundian naval commander involved in Philip the Good’s Crusade endeavors in the 1440s.
 Noël Patrocles de Thoisy (died 1671), early governor general of the French Antilles

Places

 Thoisy-la-Berchère, commune in the Côte-d'Or department in eastern France
 Thoisy-le-Désert commune in the Côte-d'Or department in eastern France